Infernal is the ninth studio album by American musician Phideaux Xavier, said to be the third and final part of his projected "Trilogy" of albums dealing with "Big Brother" authoritarianism and ecological crisis, after part one, The Great Leap, and part two, Doomsday Afternoon. It was initially announced to be ready in 2013. In 2015, Phideaux published the whole lyrics on his Facebook page and announced that the whole album was in the post-production phase, expecting to release it in 2016. In May 2018, Phideaux posted on the progressive rock forum Prog Archives that the album was finished and in the process of being mastered, with the artwork ready for printing. Five days before its intended release, it was announced that the album's release had been pushed back until September 9. The album was digitally released 9 days early on August 31.

Track listing

References

Phideaux Xavier albums
2018 albums